The Perfect Flapper is a 1924 American romantic comedy film directed by Earl Hudson and starring Colleen Moore. This was Moore's second "flapper film" after Flaming Youth. It was released after Through the Dark (made before Flaming Youth but in theaters after its release) and Painted People.

Story
Young debutante Tommie Lou is unpopular. At her coming-out party, she turns to jazz antics to liven things up. After drinking punch spiked with alcohol (illegal at the time, as the film was made during Prohibition), she gets drunk and runs off to a road house with the husband of a friend. Nothing happens between them, but the action provokes a split between the husband and his wife. She contrives to get the couple back together, falling for the wife's divorce lawyer, and in the end everyone lives happily.

Cast

Production

The film was made in the wake of the tremendous hit Flaming Youth. Originally intended to reunite the cast and crew of Flaming Youth, not everyone was available. The film was made as a comedy with dramatic undertones, while Flaming Youth had been a drama with comic aspects. To cash in on the popularity of Colleen's "flapper" character, the word "flapper" made it into the title. An additional draw was that the film showed a lot of skin.  Sydney Chaplin was, of course, Charlie's older half-brother.

Reception
The film was generally well-received as good light entertainment: "...you have been entertained and not caused to think too much.” The film did not match the popularity of Flaming Youth: an accounting of the earnings of Colleen's pictures dated December 31, 1928 lists total earnings of Flaming Youth at $798,777 by 1928; The Perfect Flapper earned $531,008.56.

Preservation
A print of The Perfect Flapper is preserved at the Library of Congress along with a trailer.

References

Bibliography
Jeff Codori (2012), Colleen Moore; A Biography of the Silent Film Star, McFarland Publishing, (Print , EBook ).

External links

Lobby card and still at silentfilmstillarchive.com

1924 films
1924 romantic comedy films
Films directed by John Francis Dillon
American silent feature films
American romantic comedy films
Lost American films
First National Pictures films
American black-and-white films
Films with screenplays by Joseph F. Poland
1924 lost films
Lost romantic comedy films
Flappers
1920s American films
Silent romantic comedy films
Silent American comedy films